Pratima Bhoumik (born 28 May 1969) is an Indian politician who  served as Minister of State in the Ministry of Social Justice and Empowerment in the Second Modi ministry since 2023 and from 2021 to 2023. She became the first Tripura resident and second woman from North East to be a Union Minister. She also got elected to the Lok Sabha, lower house of the Parliament of India from  Tripura West as a member of the Bharatiya Janata Party since 2023 and from 2019 to 2023.   In 2016, she became the State General Secretary of BJP,Tripura state unit. She is a member of BJP since 1991.  She has been elected as Member of Tripura Legislative Assembly from Dhanpur Constituency from 2023 until she resigned in 2023.

As party whip of Lok Sabha 
Smt. Pratima Bhoumik has expressed her gratitude to Prime Minister Narendra Modi and BJP president Amit Shah for including her in the party's Lok Sabha whip list.

As a Member of Parliament 
Pratima Bhoumik was elected to the 17th Lok Sabha, from Tripura West. After the result was formally declared, in an interview with IANS, the 50-year-old science graduate, Pratima Bhowmik, said: "I would work for the all-round development of the state. Prime Minister Narendra Modi and party president Amit Shah's development mantra and vision are our future course of action for the welfare of the people." 

"To fulfill Chief Minister Biplab Kumar Deb's vision to make Tripura a model state, we would all together work to achieve the dream," Bhowmik, General Secretary of the BJP's state unit, told. 

Bhowmik, securing 5,73,532 votes (51.77 percent of the valid votes polled) won the Tripura West seat defeating her Congress rival Subal Bhowmik by a margin of 3,05,689 votes, would be the second Lok Sabha member from Tripura after Congress' Maharani Bibhu Kumari Devi, also former Tripura minister, who won in 1991.

Lok Sabha Standing Committee 
Member, Standing Committee on Food, Consumer Affairs and Public Distribution
Member, Committee on Absence of Members from the Sittings of the House

Contribution of the first salary 
Pratima Bhowmik, the Lok Sabha MP from Tripura West parliamentary constituency, donated Rs 1,00,000 from her first month's salary for Assam flood relief. At least 67 people have died and 33,55,837 have been affected in the deluge that has inundated over 2,000 villages in 17 districts of Assam.

Union Minister 

She became Minister of State Ministry of Social Justice and Empowerment in Second Modi ministry when cabinet overhaul happened. She became first Central Minister from Tripura.

References

External links
  Official biographical sketch in Parliament of India website

India MPs 2019–present
Lok Sabha members from Tripura
Living people
Bharatiya Janata Party politicians from Tripura
People from Agartala
1969 births
Narendra Modi ministry
Women union ministers of state of India
Women members of the Lok Sabha
Tripura University alumni
21st-century Indian women politicians